"Hand Springs/Cedar Point '76" is a split 7" single released in 2000 by Detroit garage rock bands the White Stripes and the Dirtbombs. The White Stripes song "Hand Springs" is on the A-side and "Cedar Point '76" by the Dirtbombs is on the B-side. Only 2,000 copies were pressed and included free with the pinball fanzine Multiball.

"Hand Springs" was later featured on the 2000 compilation album Hot Pinball Rock, Vol. 1. Also, many copies of the White Blood Cells album were packaged with a bonus DVD that included audio tracks of "Hand Springs" (as well as "Lafayette Blues").

The single was packaged with another one track single, "Red Death at 6:14", as its b-side for Record Store Day 2012.

Track listing

References

External links
 The White Stripes Official Site

1999 singles
The White Stripes songs
Wikipedia requested audio of songs